Ormsgill is an area and ward of Barrow-in-Furness, Cumbria, England. It is bordered by Hindpool, Parkside, Hawcoat, Roanhead and Walney Channel. The population of the ward in 2001 stood at 5,961 (2,883 male and 3,078 female),increasing to 6,033 at the 2011 Census. Almost three quarters of Ormsgill is greenspace, with the majority of residents living in the densely populated south-east corridor. The western part of the ward is predominantly industrial and includes a large Kimberly-Clark plant and numerous other industrial estates which provide a base for companies including Blyth, BT, Gyrodata, McBride and Oil States International.

The ward itself will be combined with Parkside ward in April 2023 following formation of the new Westmorland and Furness Local Authority.

Ormsgill is one of the longest settled areas of what is now Barrow. It is home to the town's oldest continuously inhabited building; Ormsgill Farm House dated 1605. The building is Grade II* listed. Other sites of interest in the ward include High Cocken, former residence of George Romney, and Thorncliffe Cemetery and Crematorium, the largest graveyard in the borough.

2001 demographics

References

Districts of Barrow-in-Furness
Wards of Barrow-in-Furness